The Samsung Galaxy S7, Samsung Galaxy S7 Edge and Samsung Galaxy S7 Active are Android-based smartphones manufactured, released and marketed by Samsung Electronics. The S7 series serves as the successor to the Galaxy S6, S6 Edge, S6 Edge+ and S6 Active released in 2015. The S7 and S7 Edge were officially unveiled on 21 February 2016 during a Samsung press conference at Mobile World Congress, with a European and North American release on 11 March 2016. The S7 Active was unveiled on 4 June 2016, and released on AT&T in the United States on 10 June 2016.

The Galaxy S7 is an evolution of the prior year's model, with upgraded hardware, design refinements, and the restoration of features removed from the Galaxy S6, such as IP certification for water and dust resistance, as well as expandable storage with a MicroSD card. The S7 Active features a thicker more rugged frame and an increased battery capacity. The Galaxy S7 and S7 Edge are the last two phones in the Samsung Galaxy S series to have a physical home button with a front-sided fingerprint sensor embedded in the button. The S7 Active is the last in the Active series to feature three physical buttons with the fingerprint reader embedded home button, when not considering the prematurely discontinued Galaxy Note 7. It is the last phone in the Samsung Galaxy S series to be equipped with a MicroUSB-B port, which has since been replaced with USB-C technology.

The Samsung Galaxy S7 was succeeded by the Samsung Galaxy S8 in April 2017.

Specifications

Hardware

Design 
The Galaxy S7's hardware design is largely that of the S6. Samsung removed the built-in Infrared blaster due to low demand. The device retains the metal and glass chassis, but with refinements such as a rectangular home button, and a lower protrusion of the camera. Both models are available in black and gold colors; white, pink, blue and silver versions are available depending on market. As a Worldwide Olympic Partner, special editions of the Galaxy S7 Edge were released by Samsung for the 2016 Summer Olympics, with a dark blue body and hardware and software accents inspired by the colors of the Olympic rings. The devices were sold in limited quantities in selected markets, and were given to athletes participating in the 2016 Summer Olympics. In October 2016, Samsung announced a new light blue ("Blue Coral") color option, as previously offered on the recalled Galaxy Note 7.

The Galaxy S7 Edge is equipped with software that allows the curved edge to act as a ruler, a night clock and various visual notification features such as the Edge notification light for phone calls and incoming messages, of which the preferred colour can be selected for five contacts. There is an additional setting that allows adjusting the brightness of the built-in LED lamp when used as a torch between five brightness levels.

Water resistance 
The S7, S7 Edge & S7 Active are IP68-certified for dust and water resistance; unlike the Galaxy S5, the ports are sealed and thus do not require protective flaps. The S7, S7 Edge & S7 Active feature a 1440p Quad HD Super AMOLED display; the S7 & S7 Active both have a 5.1-inch panel, while the S7 Edge uses a larger 5.5-inch panel. As with the prior model, the S7 Edge's screen is curved along the side bezels of the device.

The charging port of the Galaxy S7 is equipped with a moisture sensor. When it detects moisture inside the USB port, wired charging is deactivated to prevent damage to the equipment.

Batteries 
All three models (S7, S7 Edge & S7 Active) have larger batteries in comparison to the S6, with 3000 mAh, 3600 mAh & 4000 mAh capacity respectively and support for AirFuel Inductive (formerly PMA) and Qi wireless charging standards; however, the S7 does use MicroUSB charging.

For wired charging, Qualcomm Quick Charge 2.0 with up to 15 Watts is supported. Wireless charging is supported with 7.5 Watts of effective power through a Qi 1.2 supported wireless charging plate connected to a Qualcomm Quick Charge 2.0 USB charger.

Samsung claims the Galaxy S7 to be able to fully charge using wired and wireless fast charging within 90 and 140 minutes respectively, while 100 and 160 minutes respectively on the S7 edge.

Fast charging is disabled while the device is in operation.

Camera 
The Galaxy S7 and S7 edge feature a 12-megapixel (4032×3024) rear-facing camera with "Dual Pixel" image sensor technology for faster autofocus and an f/1.7 aperture lens.

Slow motion videos are recorded with 720p HD at 240 fps, which is twice the frame rate used on the Galaxy S6 and Note 5. For the first time on a Samsung flagship device, slow motion video recording at 240fps is possible. The 240 fps footage is encoded in real-time and recorded with audio. The footage can be edited with the precluded slow motion video editing software. The five-minute time limit for 2160p video has been removed.

The improved burst shot mode captures twenty full-resolution photos per second up to one hundred photos per row. The limit was raised from the thirty photos per sequence at approximately eight photos per second on the S6.

The camera has been praised for its then excellent low-light performance.

Still photos can be captured during 1440p (30 fps) and 2160p (30 fps) video recording, while the predecessor could only do so at up to 1080p. However, still photos can not be captured during 1080p video recording at 60 frames per second.

The camera software of the Galaxy S7 has a mode for the manual adjustment of operating parameters, such as exposure, ISO light sensitivity, white balance, and exposure value. Parameters can also be set for video recording. However, the ISO light sensitivity and exposure settings are locked during video recording. In addition, the LED torch can not be toggled during video recording.

Chipsets 
Galaxy S7 devices are equipped with an octa-core Exynos 8890 system on a chip and 4 GB of RAM in China. In the United States the S7 uses the quad-core Qualcomm Snapdragon 820; unlike Exynos, this SoC supports older CDMA networks that are extensively used by carriers in these markets. The heat from the processor is transferred with a 0.4mm thick water-to-steam heat pipe cooling system but still it gets hot to touch. The S7 includes either 32, 64 or 128 GB of internal storage (in most markets only the 32 GB model will be available). Storage can be expanded using a microSD card.

S7 devices are packaged with a USB OTG adapter. It can be used with the included "Smart Switch" app to help transfer content and settings from a previous Samsung Galaxy device running Android 4.3 or later, iPhone running iOS 5 or later, or BlackBerry running BlackBerry OS 7 or earlier.

Software 

The Galaxy S7 ships with Android Marshmallow (6.0) and Samsung's proprietary TouchWiz software suite. The new TouchWiz also allows the user to disable the app drawer. A new "always on" functionality displays a clock, calendar, and notifications on-screen when the device is in standby. The display is turned off if the device's proximity sensor detects that it is in an enclosed space such as a pocket. Samsung claims this feature would only consume half a percentage of battery capacity per-hour.  New widget panes can be displayed on the edge of the S7 Edge, in "Edge Single" and wider "Edge Single Plus" sizes. Android Marshmallow's "adopted storage" feature is disabled and not usable.

A software update in September 2016 added support for Vulkan, a new low-level graphics API. In January 2017, Samsung released an update to Android 7.0 "Nougat", which replaced TouchWiz with the Samsung Experience software suite (introduced in the Galaxy S8).
  In mid 2018, the S7 and S7 edge received Android 8.0 "Oreo".

The user interface of the multi windowing feature which allows showing multiple supported applications simultaneously on the screen, both as flexible split screen, as well as floating pop-up, is similar to the preceding Galaxy S6.

Reception 
The Galaxy S7 received generally positive reviews with critics praising the return of the micro SD card slot and water resistance, while retaining the premium metal design of the preceding Galaxy S6. The design of the larger Galaxy S7 Edge was particularly praised, as its curved sides on the S7 Edge are used to "make the phone much narrower than it would be if it had a flat display. It makes the whole device smaller and easier to use. That becomes readily apparent when you put the S7 Edge next to other devices with 5.5-inch or similar screens" like the iPhone 6s Plus (5.5-inch) and Google Nexus 6P (5.7-inch). The quality of the primary (rear-facing) camera has been further improved, despite the megapixel decrease from 16 MP to 12 MP, it has larger 1.4-micron pixels and even faster focusing than its S6 predecessor.

There was some criticism of the Galaxy S7, due to the removal of MHL support and the IR Blaster of the Galaxy S6, stock music and video player apps have been replaced by the Google Play equivalents, and the inclusion of a Micro USB charging port instead of a USB Type C port.

The Exynos version is faster than the Qualcomm Snapdragon version at multitasking. There is a clear difference, as the Qualcomm version fails to keep as many apps in the background and takes more time to switch between apps. However, the Snapdragon version performs better in graphically intensive apps and games.

iFixit gave the S7 a repairability score of 3 out of 10, noting an excessive use of glue and glass panels, as well as it being nearly impossible to service certain components of the device (such as the daughterboard and other components) without removing the screen, which is not designed to be removed, and that "replacing the glass without destroying the display is probably impossible".

Sales 
Between the Samsung Galaxy S7 and the Samsung Galaxy S7 Edge, approximately 100,000 devices were sold within two days of the official launch in South Korea. The Galaxy S7 had between 7-9 million units shipped in its first month. A total of 48 million units were sold in 2016.

Galaxy S7 edge was the most popular handset from South Korean's 2016 lineup. The Galaxy J3, which is regarded as an entry-level device, found its place in the sixth most popular phone for 2016. The iPhone 6s had around 60 million shipments, whereas the Galaxy S7 edge and other phones from Samsung garnered around 25 million shipments.

Known issues 
At release, videos recorded at high frame rates stuttered, with both Exynos and Snapdragon models suffering from the issue. A following firmware update claimed to fix "flickering video playback after recording".

Some S7 Edge units have an irremovable vertical pink line on the display, which seems to appear at random. Samsung is offering free repairs/replacements for users in Belgium/Netherlands/Luxembourg  (limited to those) under warranty given that the screen is not externally damaged.

It is extremely difficult to repair a broken screen. Removal of the AMOLED panel will be required should the user break the screen on a Galaxy S7.

In the Philippines on September 23, 2016, a 36 year old make-up artist who has a Samsung Galaxy S7 Edge in a beauty salon in Antipolo City, Rizal, along with her 16-year-old daughter, who was using the phone and started to diffuse smoke over the smartphone. The owner of the smartphone said that she will refund the damaged smartphone which she bought last April 2016 and the management is investigating the incident.

Variants

Galaxy S7

Samsung Exynos 8890 Models 
 SM-G930F (International Single SIM)
 SM-G930FD (International Dual SIM)
 SM-G930W8 (Canada)
 SM-G930S (South Korea SK Telecom)
 SM-G930K (South Korea KT)
 SM-G930L (South Korea LG U+)

Qualcomm Snapdragon 820 Models

China 
 SM-G9300 (Unlocked)
 SM-G9308 (China Mobile)

United States 
The Galaxy S7 is the first Galaxy S model on which the device's hardware is essentially identical across all of the US variants. As such, all variants were assigned the same device ID (A3LSMG930US) by the FCC. The only differences between US variants is in software/firmware and some minor external branding.
 SM-G930U (Unlocked)
 SM-G930A (AT&T)
 SM-G930V (Verizon Wireless)
 SM-G930AZ (Cricket Wireless)
 SM-G930P (Sprint)
 SM-G930T (T-Mobile US)
 SM-G930R4 (US Cellular)
 SM-G930R4 (Straight Talk)

Galaxy S7 Edge

Samsung Exynos 8890 Model 
 SM-G935F (International Single Sim)
 SM-G935FD (India Dual Sim)
 SM-G935W8 (Canada)
 SM-G935S (South Korea SK Telecom)
 SM-G935K (South Korea KT)
 SM-G935L (South Korea LG U+)

Qualcomm Snapdragon 820 Model 
 SM-G9350 (China Open Model, Hong Kong)
 SM-G935V (USA Verizon Wireless)
 SM-G935A (USA AT&T)
 SM-G935P (USA Sprint)
 SM-G935T (USA T-Mobile US)
 SM-G935U (USA Samsung Unlocked)
 SM-G935R4 (USA US Cellular)
 SC-02H (Japan NTT DoCoMo)
 SCV33 (Japan KDDI au)

Galaxy S7 Active

Qualcomm Snapdragon 820 Model 
 SM-G891A (USA AT&T)

See also 
 Comparison of Samsung Galaxy S smartphones
 Comparison of smartphones
 Samsung Galaxy S series

References

External links 
 
 

Android (operating system) devices
Mobile phones introduced in 2016
Discontinued flagship smartphones
Samsung smartphones
Samsung Galaxy
Mobile phones with 4K video recording
Discontinued smartphones